The Soviet Athletics Championships was an annual outdoor track and field competition organised by the Soviet Athletics Federation, which served as the Soviet national championship for the sport.

The early history of event traces back to two events organised by a Moscow-based skiing club: this was first held in 1920 for men only. Following the Declaration of the Creation of the USSR, the next two editions in 1923 and 1924 increased in size and were held as an All-Union sports festival. A marked increase came in 1928 when 1281 athletes competed, drawing from five Union Republics, 12 regions of the Russian SDSSR and 11 foreign delegations. The event was held consistently every year from 1943 onwards. The athletics competition was incorporated into the quadrennial Spartakiad of Peoples of the USSR during the latter event's lifespan from 1956 to 1991 (with the exception of 1986).

The event programme typically was close to that featured in the Olympic Games athletics competition, though the marathon, road racewalking, and combined track and field events were usually held at separate championships. It was common for there to be both an individual Soviet Championships and a national athletics championship for clubs.

The last Soviet Athletics Championships was hosted in Kiev in 1991 and it ceased thereafter due to the dissolution of the Soviet Union. A final shared championships was held in 1992 between the Commonwealth of Independent States, after which point the newly independent nations hosted their own national championship events.

Editions

See also
List of Soviet records in athletics

References

 

 
Athletics competitions in the Soviet Union
National athletics competitions
Recurring sporting events established in 1920
Recurring sporting events disestablished in 1991
1991 disestablishments in the Soviet Union
1920 establishments in Russia
Defunct athletics competitions
Athletics